"Almost Seems (Too Late to Turn)" is a 1985 single by Irish group Clannad. It is the second single from their album Macalla.

The song was used as the official Children in Need charity single for 1985. The song stalled at number 80 in the UK charts.

Track listing
7-inch single
 Almost Seems (Too Late to Turn) [radio edit]
 Journey's End

12-inch single
 Almost Seems (Too Late to Turn)
 Theme from Harry's Game
 Journey's End
 Robin (The Hooded Man)

References

1985 singles
1985 songs
Clannad songs
Children in Need singles
Songs written by Pól Brennan